Just My Luck may refer to:

Film and television 
 Just My Luck (1933 film), a British comedy starring Robertson Hare
 Just My Luck (1936 film), a comedy starring Charles Ray
 Just My Luck (1957 film), a British sports comedy starring Norman Wisdom
 Just My Luck (2006 film), an American romantic comedy starring Lindsay Lohan and Chris Pine
 Just My Luck, a 1984 short film by Janet Greek
 "Just My Luck" (My Parents Are Aliens), an episode of My Parents Are Aliens
 "Just My Luck", an episode of Star Wars: Ewoks

Literature 
 Just My Luck (manga), a yaoi manga by Temari Matsumoto
 Just My Luck: Memoirs of a Police Officer of the Raj, a 2000 autobiography by P. E. S. Finney
 "Just My Luck", a poem by Doren Robbins

Music 
 "Just My Luck", a song by Alyson Williams
 "Just My Luck", a song by Chicosci from Fly Black Hearts
 "Just My Luck", a song by The Deele from Street Beat
 "Just My Luck", a song by Five.Bolt.Main from Live
 "Just My Luck", a song by John Scofield from Electric Outlet
 "Just My Luck", a song by Kim Richey
 "Just My Luck", a song by McFly from the soundtrack of the 2006 film Just My Luck
 "Just My Luck", a song by Mental As Anything
 "Just My Luck", a song from the musical The Body Beautiful

See also 
 "It's Just My Luck", a song by Connie Smith from Connie Smith
 "It's Just My Luck", a song by Voices in Public
 Just Your Luck, a 1972 British television drama